Dino Djiba (born 20 December 1985) is a Senegalese former professional footballer who played as a midfielder.

International career
Represented the national team at the 2006 Africa Cup of Nations, where his team took 4th place for the third time in history.

Career statistics

International

References

External links
 
 FCMetz.com 
 

1985 births
Living people
Footballers from Dakar
Association football midfielders
Senegalese footballers
Senegal international footballers
FC Metz players
Thionville FC players
French sportspeople of Senegalese descent